Parashorea smythiesii is a species of plant in the family Dipterocarpaceae. It is endemic to Borneo (Brunei, Sabah, Sarawak, and east Kalimantan). It is a large emergent tree, up to 55 m tall, found in mixed and upper dipterocarp forests on fertile clay soils. It is found in some protected areas.

Parashorea smythiesii was named after Bertram Evelyn Smythies.

References

smythiesii
Endemic flora of Borneo
Trees of Borneo